Protospongia is a genus of Porifera known from the Middle Cambrian Burgess Shale. 102 specimens of Protospongia are known from the Greater Phyllopod bed, where they comprise 0.19% of the community.

Description
Protospongia hicksi from the Burgess Shale is probably the only member of this genus of hexactinellid sponge.  Several other species of fossil sponges, such as "Protospongia" tetranema of the Little Metis Formation in Quebec, and "P." rhenana from the Hunsruck, are placed in this genus due to the architecture of their spicules resembling that of P. hicksi.

Fossils of P. hicksi consist entirely of fragments and isolated, cruciform spicules, so the living animal's average to maximum size and growth habitus are unknown.  If those "Protospongia" fossils outside of the Burgess Shale are of or closely related to P. hicksi, then the growth habitus of various species would have been globular, such as "P." tetranema, to cup-shaped, like with "P." rhenana.

References

External links 
 Burgess Shale species 108

Burgess Shale fossils
Hexactinellida genera
Prehistoric sponge genera
Burgess Shale sponges
Paleozoic life of the Northwest Territories

Cambrian genus extinctions